Linda Trujillo (born May 20, 1959) is an American politician who served in the New Mexico House of Representatives from the 48th district from 2017 to 2020. On July 9, 2020, she resigned from the New Mexico House of Representatives due to financial issues.

References

1959 births
Living people
Hispanic and Latino American women in politics
Hispanic and Latino American state legislators in New Mexico
Democratic Party members of the New Mexico House of Representatives
21st-century American women politicians